

Offseason
 August 10 : Nate Handrahan announced the signing of seven athletes to National Letters of Intent, which increases his 2009-10 recruiting class to 10 athletes.
 August 24, 2009 - Former RMU goalie Brianne McLaughlin was selected as one of three goalies to the 2009-10 U.S. Women's National Team.
 Sept 17: Robert Morris has been predicted to finish second in the College Hockey America Preseason Coaches’ Poll, released Sept. 17 by CHA league officials. They came in second with 14 points after finishing with a 5-9-2 mark in conference play a season ago.

2009-10 National Letter of Intent Signees

Exhibition

Regular season
 November 25: The Colonials announced five players signed Letters of Intent to play hockey for the team in 2010-11. The signees are: Thea Imbrogno (Mississauga Jr. Chiefs), Rebecca Vint (Brampton Jr. Thunder), Laura Brooker (Cambridge Fury), Brandi Pollock (Westman Wildcats) and Anneline Lauziere (London Devilettes).
 November 26: The Colonials will host the Rensselaer Engineers in part of College Hockey America's Skate for the Cure Campaign. This marks the fourth year of the event and all CHA institutions participate in the event.
 December 6: The Robert Morris vs. Mercyhurst game on Sunday, December 6 at 1:00 p.m. has been postponed due to a water main break at the Mercyhurst Ice Center. The game is rescheduled for Tuesday, February 2 at 7:00 p.m.
 December 17: Former Robert Morris Colonials goaltender Brianne McLaughlin was selected as one of three goalies to the 2010 U.S. Olympic Women's Ice Hockey Team. McLaughlin is the first-ever Colonial to compete in the Olympic Games.
 February 17: Brianna Delaney and Sara O’Mally are among 45 nominees for the Patty Kazmaier Memorial Award.

Standings

Roster

Schedule

Player stats

Skaters

Goaltenders

Awards and honors
 Daneca Butterfield, CHA Defensive Player of Week (Week of Oct 6)
 Daneca Butterfield, CHA Defensive Player of Week (Week of Oct 26)
 Daneca Butterfield, CHA Defensive Player of Week (Week of Nov 9)
 Brianna Delaney, CHA Player of the Week (November 16)
 Jacki Gibson, CHA Defensive Player of the Year (Week of October 12)
 Jamie Joslin, RMU Rookie of the Year (2009–10)
 Jennifer Kindret, CHA Rookie of the Week (November 9)
 Jennifer Kindret, CHA Rookie of the Week (Week of Jan 25)
 Sara O'Malley, CHA Offensive Player of Week (Week of Jan 25)
 Chelsea Walkland, Frozen Four Skills Competition participant

Pre-Season All-CHA Team
 F - Brianna Delaney, (tie)

Second Team All-CHA
 Whitney Pappas, Second Team All-CHA

See also
 2009–10 College Hockey America women's ice hockey season

References

External links
 Official site

Robert Morris
Robert Morris Lady Colonials ice hockey seasons
Robert
Robert